The 2014–15 season  will be Anorthosis' 66th consecutive season in the Cypriot First Division, the top division of Cyprus football. It covers a period from 1 July 2014 to 30 May 2015.

Season overview

Pre-season
Anorthosis Famagusta commenced their summer transfer activity on 11 June, by signing Georgian national football player Irakli Maisuradze from Valletta for 1+1 years.

On 17 June, Anorthosis announced the signing of Georgian football player Giorgi Aburjania from Lokomotivi Tbilisi for 1+1 years.

On 24 June, Anorthosis announced the signing of Razak Nuhu from Manchester City B.

On 27 June, Anorthosis announced the sale of Cypriot national footballer Valentinos Sielis to AEL Limassol.

On 2 July, Anorthosis announced the signing of Spanish footballer Albert Serrán from AD Alcorcón for the next year.

On 21 July, Anorthosis announced the signing of Ukraine national footballer with U21 Yuriy Yakovenko from Ajaccio for the next year.

On 16 August, Anorthosis announced the year loan of German Chinedu Ede from Mainz 05. and the 2 year contract with Uruguayan footballer Gonzalo García from Maccabi Tel Aviv.

On 22 August, Anorthosis announced the loan of their goalkeeper Aldo Teqja to Elpida Xylofagou for a year.

On 25 August, Anorthosis announced the year loan of Latvia national footballer Valērijs Šabala from Club Brugge.

On 28 Augusta, Anorthosis announced the 2-year contract with Sweden national footballer Markus Holgersson from Helsingborgs IF.

On 1 September,  Anorthosis announced the year loan of Belgium national goalkeeper Thomas Kaminski from Anderlecht.

August 2014
Cyprus Football Association postponed the first matchweek game between APOEL Nicosia and Anorthosis Famagusta, because of APOEL's matches for the UEFA Champions League against Aalborg BK, after the consent of Anorthosis and APOEL.

September 2014
On 1 September, Anorthosis faced Omonia Nicosia in GSP Stadium. Anorthosis lost their first game in this years league 3-2. Anorthosis equaled twice the score, at 19th minute with Chinedu Ede and at 63rd minute with Yuriy Yakovenko.

On 16 September, Anorthosis faced AEK Larnaca in Antonis Papadopoulos Stadium. Anorthosis defeated AEK 2-1 and get the 3 first points in this season. Anorthosis opens the score with Yuriy Yakovenko at 29th minute, but AEK equaled the score with Roberto Colautti at 40th minute. Anorthosis get the win in last minute after the free kick of Toni Calvo in 90+3rd minute of the match.

On 22 September, Anorthosis faced Ermis Aradippou in Dasaki Stadium. Anorthosis suffered the second defeat with score 1-0, when Marcos De Azevedo scored after the assist of Besart Ibraimi.

On 24 September, Anorthosis faced APOEL Nicosia in GSP Stadium for the 1st match day postponed match. After a good first half anorthosis not kept pace of Apoel in second half and lost for a second match in a row in GSP Stadium and in division. Gustavo Manduca opens the score at 65th minute and 9 minutes later he won a penalty and the red card of Constantinos Laifis. At 75th minute, Manduca missed the penalty, but Aloneytis followed the phase and with powerful shot formatting the final score.

On 27 September, Anorthosis faced Ayia Napa in Antonis Papadopoulos Stadium. Anorthosis does not had a particularly trouble and got the win 4-1. At 6th minute Stavros Stathakis scored an own goal. In 19th minute Ayia Napa equaled the score with David Mena as seen in the television lens the goal wrongly counted as it was prominently off side. At 55th minute Anorthosis ahead the score with Andreas Makris after a running of Razak Nuhu from the left side and the pass at the right time. 3 minutes later Emiliano Fusco get the 2nd yellow card and left Ayia Napa with 10 players. Anorthsis until the end of the match scored 2 more goals, with Giorgi Aburjania after a pass from Toni Calvo and at the last minute with a Penalty who scored Toni Calvo.

Club

Technical staff

Medical staff

Club hierarchy

Current squad
Last Update: September 28, 2014

Squad information

More Anorthosis Footballers

Transfers

In

Total expenditure:  €0

Cyprus First Division

Matches

Classification

Results summary

Results by round

Overall

Statistics

|}
1 Includes Cypriot super cup in season.

† denotes players that left the club during the season.

Goals

1 Includes Cypriot super cup in season.

Discipline

1 Includes Cypriot super cup in season.

† denotes players that left the club during the season.

References

Anorthosis Famagusta F.C. seasons
Cypriot football clubs 2014–15 season